Henry Small may refer to:

Henry Small (singer) (born 1948), American-born Canadian rock musician and recording artist
Henry Small (footballer) (c. 1881–1946), English footballer who played as an inside forward of the 1900s (Southampton, Manchester United)
Henry Beaumont Small (1831–1919), Canadian civil servant and naturalist
Henry Small, American bibliometricist known for describing co-citations